This is a list of violinists notable for their work with electric violin.

A
 Ed Alleyne-Johnson
 Laurie Anderson
 Emilie Autumn

B
 Balabhaskar
 Jenny Bae
 Billy Bang
 Randy Benson
 Andrew Bird
 Charlie Bisharat
 Urban Blitz of Doctors of Madness
 Deni Bonet

C
 Eos Chater
 Tony Conrad
 Papa John Creach
 David Cross (with King Crimson)
 Billy Currie (on recordings and live performances with Ultravox, Gary Numan, and solo)

D
 Jerald Daemyon
 Tania Davis
 Taylor Davis
 Joe Deninzon (with Stratospheerius)
 Caitlin De Ville

E
 Haylie Ecker
 Warren Ellis of Nick Cave and the Bad Seeds

F
Henry Flynt

G
 Manoj George
 Jerry Goodman of Mahavishnu Orchestra
 Stéphane Grappelli
 Ganesh and Kumaresh

H
 Elspeth Hanson
 Don "Sugarcane" Harris
 Lili Haydn
 Simon House of Hawkwind and High Tide
 Christian Howes

J
 Leroy Jenkins
 Jinxx / Jeremy Ferguson from Black Veil Brides
 Eddie Jobson (with U.K., King Crimson, Curved Air, Frank Zappa, and Roxy Music)

K
 Mik Kaminski of Electric Light Orchestra
 Eyvind Kang
 Judy Kang
 Embar Kannan
 Ben Karas
 Nigel Kennedy
 Doug Kershaw
 Olga Kholodnaya
 Carla Kihlstedt of Sleepytime Gorilla Museum
 Takehisa Kosugi
 Kit Savitr Krash of Byzar, Marc Ribot and Railroad Jerk
 Ganesh Kumaresh

L
 Henry Lau
 David LaFlamme
 Jim Lea of Slade
 Ben Lee
 Michael A. Levine
 Didier Lockwood

M
 Sean Mackin of Yellowcard
 Vanessa Mae
 Mat Maneri
 Hugh Marsh (solo and with Loreena McKennitt)
 Ben Mink (solo and with FM)

N
 Stephen Nachmanovitch
 Nash the Slash (solo and with FM)
 János Négyesy

P
 Úna Palliser
 Antonio Pontarelli
 Lorenza Ponce
 Jean-Luc Ponty

R
 David Ragsdale and Robby Steinhardt of Kansas
 Blaine L. Reininger
 Roopa Revathi
 Geoff Richardson (with Caravan)
 Jon Rose
 Davide Rossi

S
 Ric Sanders of Fairport Convention
 L. Shankar
 Ray Shulman (with Gentle Giant)
 Tracy Silverman
 Stuff Smith
 Sophie Solomon
 Sue Son (for Britain's Got Talent, as one of the semi-finals in 2009)
 Eddie South
 Eric Stanley
 Linzi Stoppard
 Lindsey Stirling
 Graham Smith (with Van der Graaf Generator)
 L. Subramaniam
 Sugizo
 Dave Swarbrick

T
 Adam Taubitz
 Yann Tiersen
 Boyd Tinsley of the Dave Matthews Band.

U
 Michał Urbaniak

V
 Olli Vänskä of Turisas
 Joe Venuti

W
 Darryl Way
 Noel Webb
 Mark Wood

Z
 Joel Zifkin of Kate & Anna McGarrigle and Richard Thompson

References

 
Electric